Raúl Moro Prescoli, known as Raúl Moro (born 5 December 2002), is a Spanish professional footballer who plays as a winger for Segunda División club Real Oviedo, on loan from Lazio.

Club career
Moro was born in Abrera, Barcelona, Catalonia. He made his Serie A debut for Lazio on 20 July 2020 in a game against Juventus.

On 23 August 2022, Moro joined Ternana on a season-long loan. In January 2023, Moro had his loan terminated and joined Real Oviedo on loan until the end of the season.

Career statistics

Club

Notes

References

2002 births
People from Baix Llobregat
Sportspeople from the Province of Barcelona
Footballers from Catalonia
Living people
Spanish footballers
Association football forwards
Spain youth international footballers
Spain under-21 international footballers
Serie A players
Serie B players
RCD Espanyol footballers
FC Barcelona players
S.S. Lazio players
Ternana Calcio players
Real Oviedo players
Spanish expatriate footballers
Spanish expatriate sportspeople in Italy
Expatriate footballers in Italy